National Research Foundation may refer to:
 National Research Foundation (Greece)
 National Research Foundation (United Arab Emirates), a foundation to promote research activity in the United Arab Emirates
 National Research Foundation (South Africa), the intermediary agency between the Government of South Africa and South Africa's research institutions
 National Research Foundation of Korea 
 National Hellenic Research Foundation